Oriolo Romano is a  (municipality) in the Province of Viterbo in the Italian region of Latium, located about  northwest of Rome and about  south of Viterbo on a hilly area near the ancient Via Clodia.

Main sights
Palazzo Altieri di Oriolo, enlarged  in 1674 during the papacy of Clement X, a member of the Altieri family. It has frescoes with stories of the Old Testament and landscapes of Altieri's former fiefs.
Fontana delle Picche, fountain designed by Jacopo Barozzi da Vignola.
Olmate, a complex of tree-sided alleys which connects Oriolo to Montevirginio, a frazione of Canale Monterano.
Parco della Mola, located in the middle of a wonderful national park just a few km away from the main village. La Mola offers perfect hiking trails, a natural thermal water bath and a small but suggestive lake with a waterfall.

References

Cities and towns in Lazio